Agnes of Ponthieu (c. 1080 – aft. 1105) was ruling Countess of Ponthieu from 1100.

She was the daughter of Count Guy I of Ponthieu.  Enguerrand, the son of Count Guy, died at a youthful age. Guy then made his brother Hugh heir presumptive, but he also died before Guy (died 1100). Agnes became count Guy's heiress, and was married to Robert of Bellême. Their son William III of Ponthieu succeeded to the county of Ponthieu after the death of Agnes (between 1105 and 1111), and the imprisonment of his father in 1112.

Sources
The Gesta Normannorum Ducum of William of Jumièges, Orderic Vitalis and Robert of Torigni, edited and translated by Elisabeth M. C. Van Houts, Clarendon Press, Oxford, 1995.

Counts of Ponthieu
Ponthieu, Agnes of
French countesses
12th-century women rulers
11th-century French women
11th-century French people
12th-century French women
12th-century French people